Danner-Fletcher House is a historic home located at Charleston, West Virginia.  It was a farmhouse built for Capt. George Danner (1826-1897) in 1896 in the late Victorian style.  It is older than most homes in South Hills and is the only house of this style in the area.

It was listed on the National Register of Historic Places in 1984 as part of the South Hills Multiple Resource Area.

References

Houses in Charleston, West Virginia
Houses completed in 1896
Houses on the National Register of Historic Places in West Virginia
National Register of Historic Places in Charleston, West Virginia
Victorian architecture in West Virginia